Marco Marozzi (born 7 January 1999) is an Italian football player.

Club career

Fiorentina
He is a product of Fiorentina youth teams and was first included on their Under-19 squad for the 2016–17 season.

Loan to Fermana
On 12 July 2018, Marozzi joined Serie C club Fermana on a season-long loan. Three months later, on 17 October, he made his professional debut in Serie C for Fermana as a 62nd-minute substitute replacing Gabriele Zerbo in a 2–0 home win over Gubbio. On 3 April 2019, Marozzi played his first match as a starter for the club, a 2–0 away defeat against Alma Juventus Fano, he was replaced by Gabriele Zerbo in the 59th minute. Marozzi ended his season-long loan to Fermana with only 12 appearances, including 11 of them as a substitute, but he didn't play any entire matches during the loan, he also helped the club to reach the play-off but Fermana loss 2–0 against Monza in the first round, he remained an unused substitute.

Loan to Virtus Francavilla 
On 20 August 2019, Marozzi was loaned to Serie C club Virtus Francavilla on a season-long loan deal. On 15 September he made his debut for the club as a substitute replacing Francesco Puntoriere for the last 21 minutes of a 2–2 away draw against Paganese. Three months later, on 15 December, he scored his first professional goal, as a substitute, in the 92nd minute of a 2–1 away defeat against Viterbese Castrense. On 22 January 2020, Marozzi played his first match as a starter for the club, a 2–1 away win over Reggina, he was replaced by Federico Vàzquez after 61 minutes. Marozzi helped the club to reach the play-offs, however Francavilla loss 3–2 against Catania in the first round. Marozzi ended his season-long loan to Virtus Francavilla with 17 appearances, 1 goal and 2 assists.

Loan to Ravenna 
On 6 September 2020, Marozzi was signed by Serie C side Ravenna on a season-long loan deal. On 27 September he made his debut for the club as a substitute replacing Daniele Ferretti in the 75th minute of a 2–1 home defeat against Südtirol. On 8 October he scored his first goal for the club, as a substitute, in the 89th minute of a 2–1 home win over Vis Pesaro. Two weeks later, on 21 October, Marozzi played his first match as a starter for Ravenna, a 2–0 home win over Virtus Verona, he was replaced in the 52nd minute by Marco Fiorani. On 24 March 2021, Marozzi played his first entire match for the club, a 0–0 away draw against Sambenedettese. Marozzi ended his loan to Ravenna with 34 appearances, 1 goal and 1 assist, he also played the play-out, however Ravenna loss 4–0 on aggregate against Legnago and was relegated in Serie D.

Career statistics

Club

References

External links
 

1999 births
People from Macerata
Sportspeople from the Province of Macerata
Living people
Italian footballers
Association football midfielders
Fermana F.C. players
Virtus Francavilla Calcio players
Ravenna F.C. players
Serie C players
Footballers from Marche